
Gmina Kowal is a rural gmina in Włocławek County, Kuyavian-Pomeranian Voivodeship, in north-central Poland. Its seat is the town of Kowal, although the town is not part of the territory of the gmina.

The gmina contains part of the protected area called Gostynin-Włocławek Landscape Park.

Villages
Gmina Kowal contains the villages and settlements of Bogusławice, Czerniewiczki, Dąbrówka, Dębniaki, Dobrzelewice, Dziardonice, Gołaszewo, Grabkowo, Grodztwo, Kępka Szlachecka, Krzewent, Nakonowo, Przydatki Gołaszewskie, Rakutowo, Strzały, Unisławice, Więsławice and Więsławice-Parcele.

Neighbouring gminas
Gmina Kowal is bordered by the town of Kowal and by the gminas of Baruchowo, Choceń, Lubień Kujawski and Włocławek.

References
Polish official population figures 2006

Kowal
Włocławek County